Charles Jackson may refer to:

Journalism and writing
 Charles James Jackson (1849–1923), British newspaper publisher, specialist on silver and gold
 Sam Jackson (publisher) (Charles Samuel Jackson, 1860–1924), American newspaper publisher
 Charles Kains Jackson (1857–1933), English editor and poet
 Charles Douglas Jackson (1902–1964), American magazine publisher, adviser to Dwight Eisenhower
 Charles R. Jackson (1903–1968), American novelist, The Lost Weekend
 Charles R. Jackson (USMC) (1898–1970), American Marine who wrote memoir about three years as a POW

Music
 Papa Charlie Jackson (1887–1938), American blues singer
 Rev. Charlie Jackson (1932–2006), American gospel singer on St. George Records
 Chuck Jackson (born 1937), R&B singer whose hits included "Any Day Now"
 Chuck Jackson (musician) (born 1953), Canadian lead singer of the Downchild Blues Band
 Chuck Jackson (born 1945), lead singer of R&B group The Independents

Science
 Charles Thomas Jackson (1805–1880), American geologist
 Charles Loring Jackson (1847–1935), American chemist
 Charlie Jackson (software) (born 1948), American software entrepreneur

Sports

American football
 Charlie Jackson (defensive back) (born 1936), American football player
 Charles Jackson (linebacker) (born 1955), American football player
 Charles Jackson (defensive back) (born 1962), American football player
 Charlie Jackson (American football coach) (born 1976), American football coach

Baseball
 Charles Jackson (baseball) (fl. 1908–1911), American baseball player
 Charlie Jackson (baseball) (1894–1968), MLB outfielder
 Chuck Jackson (baseball) (born 1963), MLB third baseman for the Texas Rangers and Houston Astros

Other sports
 Charles Jackson (basketball) (born 1993), American basketball player

Other
 Charles Jackson (bishop) (died 1790), Anglican bishop in Ireland
 Charles Jackson (judge) (1775–1855), American judge
 Charles Jackson (Rhode Island politician) (1797–1876), American governor of Rhode Island
 Charles Jackson (antiquary) (1809–1882), English banker
 Charles Jackson (serial killer) (1937–2002), American serial killer
 Charles H. Jackson Jr., American rancher, investor and polo player 
 , a merchantman purchased by the Royal Navy in 1797 and commissioned as HMS Tartarus